Lawrence Bruner (March 2, 1856 in Catasauqua, Pennsylvania – January 30, 1937 in Berkeley, California) was a United States entomologist.

Biography
Bruner's parents emigrated to West Point, Nebraska when Bruner was a child.  While growing up, he collected various insects and small animals, and his parents let him use a small carriage house behind the main home to house his collections. His father Uhriah Bruner became a regent of the University of Nebraska, and at age 15, Lawrence enrolled at the school. He received an appointment as assistant on the United States Entomological Commission in 1880, and as field agent for the United States Department of Agriculture at the University of Nebraska in 1888, where he became instructor in entomology in 1890 and professor in 1895. In 1897 and 1898, he traveled in Argentina as field agent again for the United States Department of Agriculture. Lawrence married Marcia A. Dewell on Christmas Day 1881.

Lawrence died in Berkeley, California on January 30, 1937. He is buried in the Wyuka Cemetery in Lincoln, Nebraska.

Honors
He is a member of the Nebraska Hall of Agricultural Achievement.

Works
The Destructive Locust of Argentina (2 reports, 1898 and 1900)
Locusts of Paraguay (1906)
South American Tetrigidae (1912)
New Elementary Agriculture, co-author (9th ed., 1911)

References

External links

1856 births
1937 deaths
American entomologists
People from West Point, Nebraska
People from Lehigh County, Pennsylvania
Scientists from Pennsylvania
University of Nebraska alumni
University of Nebraska faculty